(born September 29, 1973) is a Japanese popular music artist. She released the majority of her singles and albums under her real name, but from 2000 to 2001 she used the stage name amber. She has released no new material herself since 2001, but has composed songs for other artists like Spin Aqua.

Discography

Singles 
 Tenshi no Hohoemi (30 November 1994)
 sometime something (10 March 1995)
 The GIRL (10 October 1995)
 Kono Umi he (25 February 1996)
 Himawari (25 June 1996)
 Paysage (25 May 1997)
 Paradise In Me (10 August 1997)
 High & Low ep (1 October 2000)
 Namida no Marijji (22 August 2001)

Albums 
 Be there (25 April 1995)
 Single collection (25 April 1996)
 6 Months 11 Dreams (25 July 1996)
 Love Can Smooth The Way (25 September 1997)
 French Connection (3 June 1998)
 2:00 AM or later (18 October 2000)

References

External links 
 amber Official Page

1973 births
Living people
Japanese women pop singers
Singers from Tokyo
20th-century Japanese women singers
20th-century Japanese singers
21st-century Japanese women singers
21st-century Japanese singers